Huai Khayung railway station is a railway station located in Huai Khayung Subdistrict, Warin Chamrap District, Ubon Ratchathani Province. It is the location of a TPI Polene cement rail distribution center.

References 

Railway stations in Thailand
Ubon Ratchathani province